The Sofia Philharmonic  (Bulgarian: Софийска филхармония) was founded in 1928. The current music director is Nayden Todorov.

Sofia Philharmonic includes the National Philharmonic Orchestra, National Philharmonic Choir "Svetoslav Obretenov", "Sofia" quartet, “Quarto” quartet, vocal ensembles Bella Voce and Impresia.

The home of the Sofia Philharmonic is Concert Complex "Bulgaria". It includes a great concert hall “Bulgaria”, chamber music hall, studio “Music” and art gallery "Bulgaria".

Singers who performed with the Sofia Philharmonic include Placido Domingo, José Carreras, Raina Kabaivanska, Ghena Dimitrova, Nicolai Ghiaurov, Nicola Ghiuselev, Sonya Yoncheva, Krassimira Stoyanova, Vesselina Kasarova, and Darina Takova.

In 2019, Sofia Philharmonic was invited by Disney to perform a series of concerts under the Star Wars: A New Hope in Concert title in China.

References

External links
Official website (en/bg)

Bulgarian orchestras
Culture in Sofia
Musical groups established in 1928
1928 establishments in Bulgaria